Mimocalothyrza speyeri is a species of beetle in the family Cerambycidae. It was described by Hintz in 1919. It is known from the Ivory Coast and Cameroon.

References

Phrynetini
Beetles described in 1919